Murat Günak (born 9 August 1957, Istanbul) is a Turkish car designer and former head designer of Volkswagen and Mercedes-Benz.

Career
Günak studied design at Hochschule für Bildende Künste (Academy of Fine Arts) in Kassel and then studied at the Royal College of Art in London under Claude Lobo and Patrick Le Quément where he was awarded Master of Automotive Design and was sponsored by Ford.

After graduation he worked at Ford in Germany for two years and then moved to Mercedes-Benz for 8 years. Gunak moved to Peugeot to become Head of Design in 1994 and then returned to Mercedes-Benz and DaimlerChrysler in 1998 as Vice President for all passenger cars.

He joined the Volkswagen brand as Head of Design in April 2003 and took over as Head of Design of the Volkswagen Group on 1 January 2004, responsible for the design activities of all brands in the Group. He was replaced at Volkswagen by his former employee, Walter de'Silva in 2007.

Through his consultant company MGMO GmbH, he was CEO of Mindset AG between July 2008 and January 2009.

He moved to a new electric vehicle project called "Mia electric" in France, which was produced between 2011 and 2013. Günak then moved to Tretbox, now Ono, to develop further electric vehicle designs.

Car designs

Mercedes-Benz C-Class 
Mercedes-Benz SLK
Peugeot 206 CC
Peugeot 307
Peugeot 607 
Volkswagen Passat CC 
Volkswagen Passat Lingyu 
Volkswagen Golf V
Mia electric
Togg T10X

References

External links
Der Schneider von Wolfsburg (Die Zeit 11. Dezember 2003) 
Murat Günak, der Aufpolierer (Der Stern, 27. September 2004) 
Murat Günak interview (designophy)

1957 births
Living people
Turkish automobile designers
Volkswagen Group designers